Jonas Flodager Rasmussen (born 23 January 1985), known professionally as simply Rasmussen, is a Danish singer and actor. He represented Denmark in the Eurovision Song Contest 2018 in Lisbon, Portugal, with the song "Higher Ground".

Early and personal life
Rasmussen was born in Viborg. He lives in Langå with his wife and two children. He studied dramaturgy and music at Aarhus University, and works as a teacher at both the School of Performing Arts at Viborg Cultural School and Aarhus Theatre Learning.

Career
Rasmussen is the lead singer and frontman of the 1980s cover band Hair Metal Heröes, which performs covers of songs by artists such as Van Halen, Europe, Bon Jovi, Def Leppard, and Scorpions among others. He has also worked as a stage actor, performing in stage productions of musicals such as West Side Story, Rent and Les Misérables in Aarhus and Holstebro. In January 2018, he was confirmed to be taking part in Dansk Melodi Grand Prix 2018 with the song "Higher Ground". The song was later released on 5 February. Rasmussen won the competition on 10 February 2018, and went on to represent Denmark in the Eurovision Song Contest 2018 in Lisbon, Portugal on 12 May 2018, where he placed 9th overall with a score of 226 points.

Discography

Singles

References

External links

Aarhus University alumni
Eurovision Song Contest entrants for Denmark
Danish pop singers
Danish rock singers
Danish stage actors
Dansk Melodi Grand Prix winners
Eurovision Song Contest entrants of 2018
Living people
People from Viborg Municipality
People from Randers Municipality
21st-century Danish  male singers
1985 births